Fade to Black is a Nero Wolfe mystery novel by Robert Goldsborough, the fifth of seven Nero Wolfe books extending the Rex Stout canon. It was first published by Bantam in hardcover in 1990.

Fade to Black is set in the advertising world, and as such is a nice counterpoint to Stout's Wolfe novel Before Midnight (1955). Whereas the earlier book centres on jealousies within a large and established agency, and a nationwide perfume contest, the Goldsborough book is concerned with a mid-sized boutique agency coping with issues such as idea theft between ad agencies and television spots for the Super Bowl, which was still ten years in the future when Before Midnight was written.

Plot summary
Nearly all the principals in the book have something to hide, and therefore something for Archie and Wolfe to inquire about, but not every secret is criminal, and the balance between private lives (including a passionate but commercially meaningless liaison between two hostile principals) and responsible disclosure is handled adroitly, and far better than in most Rex Stout novels. Just as in Before Midnight the agency partners have strong personality clashes, but this is seen in this book as a price that is paid for complementary talents in a boutique firm.

Genesis
Wolfe's right-hand man and amanuensis Archie Goodwin is attending a Super Bowl party thrown by his good friend Lily Rowan at her East Side penthouse in Manhattan. During the game, there is a spectacular commercial involving parachutists, acrobats, and more promoting a cherry-flavored soft drink call Cherr-o-kee. One of the partners of the ad agency that put on that stunt, Rod Mills, is also at the party, and takes Goodwin aside to say that he'd like help with a problem.

Later, all three partners of Mills/Lake/Ryman meet at Wolfe's office discuss an acute problem of industrial espionage they've been having lately: their best ideas being discovered and used by a larger agency representing another cherry-flavored soft drink.

Development
The problem as presented by M/L/R is simple: to find the spy within the agency: the source of the industrial esponiage.  Therefore, Goodwin has to look into possible links between members of the firm and its rival.  While this remains elusive, it becomes clear that the executive of the rival drink's campaign is the recipient of the information, but it isn't long before he is found dead in his apartment (by Archie, who else?).

This prompts the owner of Cherr-o-kee, a reclusive part-Cherokee billionaire named Acker Foreman to pay Wolfe a visit, along with his two adult sons, Arnold and Stephen.  Despite the tense situation, Wolfe gains Acker Foreman's respect with his knowledge of his career and of Cherokee history, especially the Trail of Tears (documented poignantly by de Tocqueville in Democracy in America).  Arnold, however, displays the same hostility as he has to M/L/R personnel.

Dénouement
After further investigation, Wolfe gathers the interested parties at his brownstone to lay out his proposed solution, this time without enough evidence to please law enforcement. However, since his mandate is simply to stop industrial espionage, he can (arguably) collect his fee.  The rest is left for the reader to discover.

Characters
 Nero Wolfe – the detective, protagonist
 Archie Goodwin – Wolfe's right-hand man
 Lily Rowan – who throws the party which Archie and Mills attend
 Rod Mills – a partner in the ad agency
 Boyd Lake – a partner in the ad agency
 Sara Ryman – a partner in the ad agency
 Acker Foreman – a reclusive part-Cherokee billionaire
 Arnold and Stephen Foreman – his sons

Publication history
 1990, USA, Bantam Books , Pub date ? October 1990, hardback (First edition)
 1991, USA, Bantam Books , Pub date ? September 1991, paperback

Nero Wolfe novels by Robert Goldsborough
1990 American novels